
Gmina Chełmno is a rural gmina (administrative district) in Chełmno County, Kuyavian-Pomeranian Voivodeship, in north-central Poland. Its seat is the town of Chełmno, although the town is not part of the territory of the gmina.

Villages
Gmina Chełmno contains the villages and settlements of Bieńkówka, Borówno, Dolne Wymiary, Dorposz Chełmiński, Górne Wymiary, Kałdus, Klamry, Kolno, Łęg, Małe Łunawy, Nowawieś Chełmińska, Nowe Dobra, Osnowo, Ostrów Świecki, Podwiesk, Różnowo, Starogród Dolny, Starogród Górny and Wielkie Łunawy.

Neighbouring gminas
Gmina Chełmno is bordered by the gminas of Dragacz, Grudziądz, Kijewo Królewskie, Płużnica, Pruszcz, Stolno, Świecie and Unisław.

References
Polish official population figures 2006

Chelmno
Chełmno County